Klęskowo may refer to the following places in Poland:
Klęskowo, Pomeranian Voivodeship
Klęskowo, Szczecin